Annika Fríðheim Petersen (born 1 June 1999) is a Faroese handballer who plays for Nykøbing Falster Håndboldklub in the Danish Women's Handball League and the Faroe Islands women's national team.

She made her debut on the senior team of Nykøbing Falster Håndboldklub, on 13 February 2022. It was announced that she had signed a 3-year contract with the club, until the summer of 2024.

She made her debut on the Faroese national team on 2 October 2019, against Romania and has been appearing for the team during the 2022 European Women's Handball Championship qualification cycle.

References

1999 births
Living people
People from Tórshavn Municipality
Faroese female handball players
Expatriate handball players